Sabha Governorate (or Sebha Governorate) was one of the governorates (muhafazah) of Libya from 1963 to 1983. It was formed from part of Fezzan province. Its capital was Sabha. In 1970, it had a population of around 97,000.

References 

Governorates of Libya
Governorate